Edinburgh Pentlands was a constituency of the House of Commons of the Parliament of the United Kingdom, first used in the general election of 1950, and abolished prior to the general election of 2005. It elected one Member of Parliament (MP) by the first past the post system of election.

In 1999, a Scottish Parliament constituency was created with the same name and boundaries, and continues in use. See Edinburgh Pentlands (Scottish Parliament constituency).

Boundaries 

In 2005, prior to the general election, the Westminster constituency was one of six covering the City of Edinburgh council area. Five were entirely within the city council area. One, Edinburgh East and Musselburgh, straddled the boundary with the East Lothian council area, to take in Musselburgh. Edinburgh Pentlands covered a south-western portion of the city council area.

In terms of wards used for elections to the City of Edinburgh Council, 1999 to 2007, Edinburgh Pentlands included wards named Balerno, Baberton, Colinton, Craiglockhart, Fairmilehead, Firrhill, Murrayburn, Parkhead, and Sighthill. The South Morningside ward was split between Edinburgh Pentlands and Edinburgh South. The seat had an urban north and a suburban centre. The remaining area was rural, and included a Pentland Hills area in the south.

In 2005, most of the constituency became part of Edinburgh South West. The Fairmilehead and South Morningside wards went to Edinburgh South. For the 2005 election, there were five constituencies covering the city area, all entirely within that area.

Members of Parliament

Elections

Elections in the 1950s

Elections in the 1960s

Elections in the 1970s

Elections in the 1980s

Elections in the 1990s

Election in the 2000s

See also
 Politics of Edinburgh

Notes and references

Pentlands
Historic parliamentary constituencies in Scotland (Westminster)
Constituencies of the Parliament of the United Kingdom established in 1950
Constituencies of the Parliament of the United Kingdom disestablished in 2005